Scoglietto Lighthouse  is an active lighthouse located on the summit of a rocky islet without vegetation located in front of Portoferraio in the Piombino Channel at  from Punta Capo Bianco and  from Punta Falconaia.

Description
The first historic lighthouse was established in 1910. It was reconstructed in 1945 due to its destruction during World War II. The lighthouse is fully automated and operated by Marina Militare identified by the code number 2068 E.F.

See also
List of lighthouses in Italy

References

External links 

 Servizio Fari Marina Militare 

Lighthouses in Italy
Lighthouses in Tuscany